Yannis Romaric Salibur (born 24 January 1991) is a French professional footballer who plays as a midfielder.

Club career
Born in Saint-Denis, Salibur began his career with his local club Red Star Paris. In early 2004, he was one of three Red Star players selected to attend the prestigious Clairefontaine academy. After spending three years there, he signed with Nord-based side Lille OSC.

Despite reported interests from Italian sides Roma, Torino, and Udinese, Salibur signed his first professional contract with Lille in June 2008. The contract was for three years. For the 2008–09 season, he was placed on Lille's first-team squad, though he would not be handed a number. He instead continued playing in the reserves. He made his professional football debut for Lille on 23 January 2009, a day before his 18th birthday, in a Coupe de France match against USL Dunkerque coming on as a substitute in the 76th minute. In his three years at Lille he played in the regional league for the Lille  "B" team 41 times scoring 4 goals.

On 13 January 2011, Salibur joined Ligue 2 club US Boulogne on an 18-month contract.

On 6 August 2012, Salibur signed a three-year contract with Ligue 2 side Clermont Foot.

On 31 December 2015, En Avant de Guingamp announced the signing Salibur with the Ligue 1 side, on a three-and-a-half-year contract. Premier League club Hull City agreed a few to sign Salibur on 31 January 2017, but were unable to process the deal before the transfer window closed.

On 31 August 2018, an hour before the closing of the 2018 summer transfer window, Salibur joined league rivals AS Saint-Étienne on loan for the season.

On 22 August 2019, Salibur joined La Liga side RCD Mallorca on a three-year contract. On 17 September of the following year, after the club's relegation, he terminated his contract.

International career
Salibur was born in France to a Guadeloupean father, and is also of Congolese descent. He is a France youth international having played for the U-16s, U-17s, and last played for the France U-18 squad. He was a part of the U-17 squad that finished runners-up at the 2008 UEFA European Under-17 Football Championship.

References

External links
 
 
 
 

1991 births
Living people
Sportspeople from Saint-Denis, Seine-Saint-Denis
French footballers
France youth international footballers
Association football midfielders
Red Star F.C. players
INF Clairefontaine players
Lille OSC players
US Boulogne players
Clermont Foot players
En Avant Guingamp players
AS Saint-Étienne players
RCD Mallorca players
Fatih Karagümrük S.K. footballers
Ligue 2 players
Ligue 1 players
La Liga players
Süper Lig players
French expatriate footballers
Expatriate footballers in Spain
Expatriate footballers in Turkey
French expatriate sportspeople in Spain
French expatriate sportspeople in Turkey
French sportspeople of Democratic Republic of the Congo descent
French people of Guadeloupean descent
Footballers from Seine-Saint-Denis
Black French sportspeople